Placeholder may refer to:

Language
 Placeholder name, a term or terms referring to something or somebody whose name is not known or, in that particular context, is not significant or relevant.
 Filler text, text generated to fill space or provide unremarkable and/or standardised text.
 Lorem ipsum, a standard Latin text most commonly used to demonstrate a font, typography or layout.

Mathematics and computer science
 Free variable, a symbol subsequently replaced by a value or string.
 Interpoled variable of a string interpolation  process.
 Metasyntactic variable, a placeholder name (see above) as used in computer science.
 Format placeholder, used in computing to format strings within print functions (printf).

Other uses
 Line stander, a person standing in a queue for another. 
 Placeholder (politics), a person temporarily appointed to an office that would otherwise remain vacant.

See also
 Filler (disambiguation)
 Spacer (disambiguation)
 Stand-in
 Substitute (disambiguation)